Michael George "Mike" Goulian (born September 4, 1968 in Winthrop, Massachusetts) is an American aerobatic national champion aviator who raced in the Red Bull Air Race World Series under the number 99.

Biography 

Goulian was born into an aviation business family, which founded Executive Flyers Aviation, one of the largest flying schools in the Northeastern United States in 1964. Michael's father Myron Goulian (also known as "Mike") was an FAA examiner. Michael grew up by washing airplanes and sweeping the hangar floor. He learned to fly before he could drive a car and soloed in a Cessna 150 on his 16th birthday in 1984.

Inspired by the 1980 movie Cloud Dancer, Goulian began his aerobatic training in 1985 during his pilot study. He then established an aerobatic school within Executive Flyers Aviation. While earning his living as a corporate airline pilot, Goulian worked his way toward the top ranks of air show display flying and competition aerobatics and became US National Champion in the Advanced Category at the age of 22, making him the youngest pilot ever to have won that competition. In 1992, he was the top-ranked US male aerobatic pilot and Silver Medalist in the Unlimited Category, an achievement he repeated in 1993. In 1995, he became the US National Champion in the Unlimited Category. He was a member of the US Aerobatic Team in 1994, 1996 and 1998.

In 2006, Goulian was awarded the prestigious Art Scholl Memorial Award for airshow showmanship by the International Council of Airshows (ICAS).

Goulian is co-author of a series of books called Basic and Advanced Aerobatics, published by McGraw Hill, which became the industry standard for aerobatic flight training manuals.

He is the co-founder of two Bedford, Massachusetts, United States-based aviation companies: Linear Air, which offers air taxi services using very light jets and piston-powered aircraft, and Mike Goulian Aviation, which is a Cirrus aircraft training, management and rental company.

In 2021, AOPA named Goulian chairman of its Hat in The Ring Society, a philanthropic foundation that promotes aviation access, safety and education.

He flies a Cirrus SR22T for his business and personal travels, and is an avid skier, ice hockey player and golfer. He has been married to Karin Goulian since 2000, with whom he has one daughter: Emily (born 2006).

Racing record

Red Bull Air Race World Championship

2004-2010

2014-

Legend:
 CAN: Cancelled
 DNP: Did not participate
 DNS: Did not show
 DQ: Disqualified
 NC: Not classified

See also
 Competition aerobatics

References

External links

Goulian Aerosports
Mike Goulian Aviation
2018 article in The Boston Globe

1968 births
Living people
American people of Armenian descent
Aerobatic pilots
American air racers
Aviators from Massachusetts
People from Winthrop, Massachusetts
Red Bull Air Race World Championship pilots
Commercial aviators